Provincial road N702 (N702) is a road connecting Rijksweg 6 (A6) in southern Almere with A6 in northern Almere.

External links

702
702